The Ringwood and District Cricket Association (or, better known as the RDCA) is a club cricket competition based in the outer eastern suburbs of Melbourne, Victoria. The competition consists of 31 clubs based around the Ringwood area of Melbourne and has been running seasonally since its induction in 1920/21 season.

In the 2006/07 season, the Association consisted of 32 grades ranging from Under 12's through to Veteran and Master classes. In addition, the RDCA also operate non-competitive grades in both Under 10 and Under 12 levels to assist in the development of the game.

In senior competition, Division 1 is known as the Lindsay Trollope Shield, Division 2 as the Wilkins Cup and Division 3 as the Newey Plate. These three divisions are composed predominantly of the first eleven of each club. Lower sides compete in a grading system from A Grade to M grade.

Prior to the 2010/11 season, Division 1 was known as the Chandler Shield. The name was changed to the Lindsay Trollope Shield between seasons at the RDCA AGM in August 2010 in recognition of his contributions to the RDCA for many years.

Clubs

Current clubs
Ainslie Park Cricket Club
Bayswater Park Cricket Club
Boronia Cricket Club
Chirnside Park Cricket Club
Croydon Cricket Club
Croydon North Cricket Club
Croydon Ranges Cricket Club
East Ringwood Cricket Club
Eastfield Cricket Club
Heathwood Cricket Club
Kilsyth Cricket Club
Lilydale Cricket Club
Montrose Cricket Club
Mooroolbark Cricket Club
Mount Evelyn Cricket Club
North Ringwood Cricket Club
Norwood Cricket Club
Ringwood Cricket Club
Scoresby Cricket Club
Seville Cricket Club
South Croydon Cricket Club
South Warrandyte Cricket Club
St Andrews Cricket Club
Templeton Cricket Club
Wantirna Cricket Club
Wantirna South Cricket Club
Warrandyte Cricket Club
Warranwood Cricket Club
Wonga Park Cricket Club

Former clubs
Academy Cricket Club
Aquinas Cricket Club
Bayswater Cricket Club
Bayswater North Cricket Club
Boronia Churches Cricket Club
Boronia United Cricket Club
Croydon High School Cricket Club
Croydon Hockeyers Cricket Club
Croydon United Cricket Club
East Ringwood United Churches Cricket Club
Eley Park Cricket Club
Ferntree Gully Cricket Club
Glen Park Cricket Club
Heathmont Uniting Cricket Club
Johnson Park Cricket Club
Knox Churches Cricket Club
Knox City Cricket Club
Knox Gardens Cricket Club
Knoxfield Cricket Club
Mooroolbark Baptists Cricket Club
Olinda Cricket Club
Park Orchards Cricket Club
Parkwood Cricket Club
Ringwood Footballers Cricket Club
Ringwood RSL Cricket Club
Ringwood Uniting Cricket Club
Riversdale Cricket Club
Ruskin Park Cricket Club
South Ringwood Cricket Club
St Stephens Cricket Club
The Basin Salvation Army Cricket Club
Valley Cricket Club
Vermont Cricket Club
Westwood Cricket Club
Yarra Valley Cricket Club

External links
Official Ringwood And District Cricket Association website

Australian domestic cricket competitions
Cricket in Victoria (Australia)
1920 establishments in Australia